The Otomi or Otontin were an elite Aztec military order, named after the Otomi people.

The Otomies (Otontin [21]) were another warrior society who took their name after the Otomi people who were renowned for their fierce fighting. In the historical sources it is often difficult to discern whether the word otomitl "Otomi" refers to members of the Aztec warrior society, or members of the Otomí ethnic group who also often joined the Aztec armies as mercenaries or allies.

One famous member of the Otomi was Tzilacatzin.

See also
Aztec warfare

Aztec warfare
m
Military units and formations of the Middle Ages